Ailao or Ai Lao may refer to:

 Ailao Mountains, Yunnan, China
 'Ailao, a traditional Samoan dance, a precursor to the Taualuga 
 Ailao, an ancient tribal alliance country, now Dehong Dai and Jingpo Autonomous Prefecture
 Ailao toad (Bufo ailaoanus), a species of toad endemic to China
 Ai Lao, Saopha of Kengtung

See also
 Laos
 Lao Ai (died 238 BCE), official of the State of Qin during the late Warring States period